Jemma Lucy (née Henley) (born 16 May 1988) is a British reality television personality and glamour model, best known for her role in Ex on the Beach series 3 and series 5.

Career
In 2005, she appeared in Brat Camp. In 2011, she participated in Signed by Katie Price. In 2016, she walked out of the Ex on the Beach house in series 5. In 2017, she participated in Celebrity Big Brother 20, being evicted first on the final night in sixth place.

In July 2019, an Instagram post by Lucy was banned by the Advertising Standards Authority after it was ruled that the image and text encouraged unsafe practices during pregnancy, made claims about weight loss and was not properly identified as an advert.

Filmography

References

1988 births
Living people
Mass media people from Manchester
Participants in British reality television series